Kościuszko Square is the representative and central square of Białystok, capital of Podlaskie Voivodeship in north-eastern Poland.

History

The beginnings of the Białystok Market Square date back to the 15th century. It was created at the intersection of roads leading to Suraż, Wasilków and Choroszcz. With time around
spontaneously created square, without a clearly defined plan, buildings began to grow. About In 1547, in the south-eastern part of it, a wooden church was built, in place of the present buildings of the monastery of the Sisters of Mercy.

In 1708, the square was given its final shape. Its elongated, slightly curved frontage -south and north - they narrowed at the central point of the square so that it divided into two parts. The first of them eastern, clearly associated with the royal residence. The area was occupied of parish church there. Over time, the most important foundations appeared next to him Branicki - monastery and hospital.  The second part – the west, with a centrally located town hall, was associated with city functions.

Work started in 1726 and was interrupted by two great fires in 1753. Most of the northern part of the city was destroyed. By rebuilding the Market Square, Jan Klemens Branicki made sure that its buildings were harmonious. All buildings were made of brick or were made of brick front wall. Street inlets were highlighted with representative, two-story houses. At the corners of Wasilkowska Street (now Sienkiewicza) stood the tenement house "Pod Łosiem" and manor house (currently Astoria restaurant).

In 1919, the market was named after Tadeusz Kościuszko. In 1925 they were made in this parts of the city center cleaning works. After the occupation of Bialystok by the Soviets, the market radically changed its face. First, in 1940, its name was changed. Along with ul. Piłsudskiego (Lipowa) and Kilińskiego were changed Sovetskaya Street. After the occupation of Bialystok by the Germans the square once again changed its name to Gross Markt (Great Market). In the years 1941–1944 the entire downtown of Białystok was destroyed as well as most of the buildings in the square.

The reconstruction was carried out in the years 1945–1958. The main authors were Władysław Paszkowski and Stanisław Bukowski. Initially, the work was carried out in an uncoordinated manner. Some of the buildings on the northern frontage were rebuilt using the economic method, while the afternoon frontage was filled with buildings in the style of classicizing modernism. It wasn't until 1955 that Stanisław Bukowski, together with Zenon Filipczuk, began to organize the market buildings. As a result, their actions were rebuilt in the western and northern part in the spirit of historicism, referring to the architecture of the 1920s. In the northern frontage, the most interesting buildings should be reconstructed according to projects Stanisaw Bukowski and Zenon Filipczuk: the armory, which housed the State Archives in Bialystok and the Astoria restaurant. On the other side, Sienkiewicza Street, there is a building from the People's Republic of Poland period, the former seat of the Polish-Soviet Friendship Society and the International Press Club and the EMPiK. In the eastern part of the southern frontage, the reconstructed monastery of the Sisters of Mercy, called the House of St. Marcin, and in its central part, a modernist bank building, with a staircase and front projection decoration, reminiscent of the Art Deco style, and the realist socialism building of PPede, the first department store in Białystok. The western part is made up of five post-war tenement houses in the historicist style, which were decorated in the 1970s with the sgraffito technique.

Overview

Western frontages

The western side of the square forms the building line between Suraska Lipowa streets, at the height of Spółdzielcza Street. Behind the colorful facades of the tenement houses that were rebuilt after the war, under which Bialystok painters and visiting painters put up for sale all summer months, found a gallery, a press salon, the Wedel cafe (formerly Marszand's favorite cafe here), the Akcent bookshop and cafe, pizzeria Chilli Pizza.

Facades of tenement houses are decorated with sgraffito decorations. Next to plant elements, animal images, muses figures are portraits of people distinguished for the region:

Jan Krzysztof Kluk - naturalist from Ciechanowiec, author of "The Dictionary of Plants".
Princess Anna Jabłonowska of Siemiatycze - a known reformer of the Enlightenment period,
Adrian Krzyżanowski - mathematician, physicist and historian, born in Dąbrowa Białostocka,
Krzysztof Lach Szyrma, a writer and political scientist from Olecko,
Antoni Stanisław Wagi, an entomologist from Grabowo.

Northern frontage

The northern frontage (in the eastern part) begins from John Paul II Square to the intersection with Sienkiewicza Street. A representative promenade preserved in the form of a street.

Cathedral Basilica of the Assumption of the Blessed Virgin Mary (corner of Kościelna Street)
Kościuszko Square 2 - Ton Cinema
Kościuszko Square 4 - Cekhauz, which housed the State Archives, in front of which is currently a monument of J. Piłsudski,
Kościuszko Square 6 - Astoria restaurant (corner of Sienkiewicza street),

The northern frontage (in the western part) of Kościuszko Square starts from Sienkiewicza Street and runs towards Lipowa Street (to the intersection with Spółdzielcza Street).

Kościuszko Square 8 - EMPIK (corner of H. Sienkiewicza street),
Kościuszko Square 16 - Branch No.1 of PKO Bank Polski (corner of Zamenhofa Street),
Kościuszko Square 24 - Almatur (travel agency).

Southern frontage

Kościuszko Square 5 - historic monastery of the Sisters of Mercy of St. Vincent.
Kościuszko Square 7 - Bank BPH.
Kościuszko Square 9 - Board of Education.
Kościuszko Square 11 - former "Nowy" Shopping Center (General Department Store), currently Bierhalle restaurant. Opened in 1955, the project was ready as early as 1949.
Kościuszko Square 13 - Polish Post Office, "Czerwony Piano" cafe, "Złotnictwo" jewelry store.
Kościuszko Square 15 - Podlasie beer house and bar.

References

External links

Squares in Poland
Białystok